Mohammed ibn al-Talib al-Tawudi ibn Suda (1700–1795) was one of the most influential scholars of the 18th century in Morocco, both politically and intellectually. He is described by the Egyptian historian, Al-Jabarti, as the "crescent of the Maghrib". He went on the hajj in 1767-1768 and studied in Medina with Mohammed ibn Abdel Karim al-Samman (1718–1775), founder of the Sammaniyya branch of the Khalwatiyya and in Cairo with the Indian scholar Mohammed Murtada al-Zabidi (d. 1791). In Cairo he also taught the Muwatta of Malik ibn Anas at the Al-Azhar. Ibn Suda was appointed by the sultan in 1788 to reform the curriculum at the Qarawiyin University of Fez, where he was installed as mufti and shaykh al-jamaa. Ibn Suda is also well known as the author of a commentary on Sahih al-Bukhari and as the teacher of Ahmed ibn Idris.

See also 

 Zawiya of Sidi Taoudi Ben Souda

References

Moroccan writers
Moroccan Maliki scholars
1700 births
1795 deaths
18th-century Moroccan people
People from Fez, Morocco